Mecodema ponaiti is a species of ground beetle endemic to the Poor Knights Islands, Northland, New Zealand.

References

ponaiti
Beetles of New Zealand
Beetles described in 2011